Jeanne Birdsall (born 1951) is an American photographer and writer of children's books. She is best known for her five-volume series about the Penderwick family. The Penderwicks, the first book in the series, won the 2005 National Book Award for Young People's Literature.

Life

Birdsall was born in Philadelphia, Pennsylvania and grew up in the suburbs. Birdsall has one sibling, a sister who is four years older than she. She decided to become a writer at the age of ten — but she didn't start until she was forty-one. She worked first on other jobs, most notably as a photographer, and some of her work has been displayed in galleries around the world.

Writer

Birdsall's first book was published when she was 54. The Penderwicks: A Summer Tale of Four Sisters, Two Rabbits, and a Very Interesting Boy introduced the Penderwick sisters and won the 2005 National Book Award. Her second book was a sequel, The Penderwicks on Gardam Street (2008). Her third book was The Penderwicks at Point Mouette (2011), followed by The Penderwicks in Spring (2015). The fifth and final book in the series, The Penderwicks at Last, was published on May 15, 2018.

Birdsall's first picture book, Flora's Very Windy Day, was illustrated by Matt Phelan and published under the Clarion Books imprint in August 2010, and followed by Lucky and Squash in 2012.

Works
 The Penderwicks: A Summer Tale of Four Sisters, Two Rabbits, and a Very Interesting Boy (Alfred A. Knopf, 2005) —winner of the National Book Award
 The Penderwicks on Gardam Street (Knopf, 2008)
 Flora's Very Windy Day (Clarion/Houghton Mifflin, 2010), children's picture book illustrated by Matt Phelan 
 The Penderwicks at Point Mouette (Knopf, 2011)
 Lucky and Squash (Harper/HarperCollins, 2012), picture book illus. Jane Dyer 
 The Penderwicks in Spring (Knopf, 2015)
 My Favorite Pets: by Gus W. for Ms. Smolinski's Class (Knopf, 2016), picture book illus. Harry Bliss
 The Penderwicks At Last (Knopf, 2018)

Collections
Philadelphia Museum of Art
Smithsonian American Art Museum

References

External links
 
 

1951 births
American children's writers
National Book Award for Young People's Literature winners
Writers from Northampton, Massachusetts
Writers from Philadelphia
Boston University alumni
Living people
Date of birth missing (living people)
American women children's writers
21st-century American women
American women photographers